This is a list of notable events in country music that took place in the year 1924.

Events 
 First broadcast of WLS Barn Dance in Chicago, led by the "Solemn Old Judge" George D. Hay.
 Beginning of the "Old Times Tunes" series on Okeh Records.
 Beginning of the "Special Records for Southern States" series on Vocalion Records.
 August 13 Vernon Dalhart records "The Prisoner's Song" and "Wreck of the Old 97."

Top Hillbilly (Country) Recordings

The following songs were extracted from records included in Joel Whitburn's Pop Memories 1890-1954, record sales reported on the "Discography of American Historical Recordings" website, and other sources as specified. Numerical rankings are approximate, they are only used as a frame of reference.

Births 
 January 6 – Earl Scruggs, early bluegrass pioneer who, with Lester Flatt, formed the Foggy Mountain Boys (died 2012).
 February 16 – Jo Walker-Meador, Country Music Association Executive Director from 1962 to 1991 (died 2017).
 March 29 – Jimmy Work, 94, American country singer-songwriter ("Making Believe") (died 2018).
 April 21 – Ira Louvin, member of The Louvin Brothers (with brother Charlie). (died 1965)
 June 20 – Chet Atkins, session musician and record producer, primarily with RCA Records (died 2001).
 June 28 – George Morgan, pop-styled singer of the 1940s and 1950s; Grand Ole Opry stalwart and father of 1990s star Lorrie Morgan (died 1975).
 July 22 – Margaret Whiting, female country and pop vocalist of the 1940s and early 1950s; first female vocalist to top the Billboard country charts (1949's "Slippin' Around," as part of a duet with Jimmy Wakely). (died 2011)
 September 19 – Don Harron, Canadian comedian and playwright best known to country audiences as "Charlie Farquharson" on television's Hee Haw (died 2015).

Deaths

References

Further reading 
 Kingsbury, Paul, "Vinyl Hayride: Country Music Album Covers 1947–1989," Country Music Foundation, 2003
 Millard, Bob, "Country Music: 70 Years of America's Favorite Music," HarperCollins, New York, 1993
 Whitburn, Joel. "Top Country Songs 1944–2005 – 6th Edition." 2005.

Country
Country music by year